Nandu Bhende (27 November 1952 – 11 April 2014) was an Indian singer and actor.

Life
Sadanand (Nandu) Bhende was the son of the Marathi actor-director Atmaram Bhende and Dr Asha Bhende (Born Lily Ezekiel Talkar of The Jewish Indian Bene Israel community).

He was a theater artist, singer, music composer, music producer.
He was one of the pioneers of rock music in India.
 
Bhende sang with 1970s bands such as Velvette Fogg, Brief Encounter and then Savage Encounter. He later went on to perform the roles of Judas in Alyque Padamsee's production of Jesus Christ Superstar and the role of Jesus in the Bangalore version of the same opera; this lead onto further roles in Tommy, Fantastiks and Jaya. He was also a playback singer in Bollywood films, his most famous work being in the 1982 musical "Disco Dancer", for which he received a Gold Disc. His maternal uncle was the noted Indian Jewish poet  Nissim Ezekiel (Talkar).

He died on 11 April 2014 at Mumbai.

He was married and had 2 children.

Bands
He performed with various bands like Savage Encounter, The Brief Encounter, Velvette Fogg, Nandu Bhende Rock Revue, etc.
 
His last venture was Nandu Bhende Encounter: Last performed on 27 March 2014 at High Street Phoenix, Mumbai @ Tribute to The Beatles.

Theatre Performances
Nandu's performance in "Superstar" as Judas made Dr Jabbar Patel cast him as "Mack the Knife" in "Teen Paischacha Tamasha", a Marathi Musical version of Brecht's "Three Penny Opera". This musical adapted by P.L. Deshpande went on to perform over 200 shows and is still remembered for its path-breaking music score which was partly composed by Nandu. Playing the title role of the deaf, dumb and blind boy in the Indian production of Pete Townsend's "Tommy" followed in 1982 for which Nandu scored the music, adding a couple of original compositions. Recently, Nandu sang and acted the main role in the BPL—Best of Theatre—series sponsored "Jaya" to great critical acclaim. This was India's first original Rock Opera and was performed in grand style with a cast of over 40 people. Nandu has also produced numerous Theater productions which have gone to stage thousands of shows throughout the country. Some of them are "The Fantastiks", "Double Trouble", "Hanky Panky", "Rashoman", "The Yours, Mine and Ours Show" etc.

Jesus Christ Superstar, as Judas.
Jesus Christ Superstar,(Bangalore) as Jesus.
Teen Paischacha Tamasha,(Marathi version of Brecht's The Threepenny Opera), as Ankush.
Jaya as Yudhishtra
The Fantastiks, as  El Gallo
Tommy (Indian production)

Theatre Productions
Casanova
Double Trouble,
Hanky Panky,
Rashoman,
The Yours, Mine and Ours Show,

Singing
Bhende sang playback for Hindi films for music directors such as R.D. Burman, Laxmikant Pyarelal and Bappi Lahiri for whose film "Disco Dancer" Nandu went on to fetch a Gold Disc. In 1980 Nandu teamed up with Music India to produce the very successful dance albums "Disco Duniya" and "Disco Nasha". HMV snapped up Nandu in 1986 and two lively disco albums followed "Disco Zamana" and "Disco Mazaa". Nandu then went on to record his first English album for HMV "GET ORGANIZED" which featured his original compositions as well as a few songs from a collection specially written for him by the Sahitya Academy Award-winning internationally acclaimed poet Nissim Ezekiel. The Hindi Pop Album "TERE LIYE" followed soon after. In 1997, the recording company Tips, released "Aaa Jaane Jaa", a Remix album with Nandu Bhende.In 2001, Nandu released another Remix album, this time for Universal and in Marathi. It was called "Spicy Mango-Raapchick Remix" and became a big hit among the youth of Maharashtra.

These films include:
Disco Dancer
Chamatkar
Zakhm
Shankara Bharanam
Shiva Ka Insaaf,

Albums
Disco Vavtal
Aaa Jaane Jaa(TIPS)
Disco Duniya(Music India)
Disco Mazaa(HMV)
Disco Nasha(Music India)
Disco Zamana(HMV)
GET ORGANIZED(Solo English Album Songs by internationally acclaimed poet Nissim Ezekiel)
Kaun Hai Woh
 Sensations
Spicy Mango-Raapchick Remix(Universal)
TERE LIYE(HMV The Hindi Pop Album)

TV serial composer credits
Cats (Sony)
Chamatkar (Sony)
"Chandrakanta"(DD1)
Daayre (Zee TV)
Jeena Isi Ka Naam Hai (Zee TV)
Kohra(StarPlus)
Maal hai to taal hain (Star Plus)
Mang Hai Rangachari (TVI)
Memsaab(TVI),
Parakh (DD1) 
Chunav Chunauti 98 (Sony)
Tanha(Star Plus)
Yeh Hai Raaz (Star Plus)
Rang Hai Rangachari (TVI)
Yeh Hai Raaz (Star Plus)

Film credits
"David Sassoon, The great philanthropist" for ORT INDIA
Rock...the alternate years

References

External links

2014 deaths
Indian Jews
Indian rock singers
Indian rock musicians
Jewish singers
Place of birth missing
1956 births
20th-century Indian singers
20th-century Indian male actors
21st-century Indian male actors
21st-century Indian singers
20th-century Indian composers
Musicians from Mumbai
Male actors from Mumbai
Indian male stage actors
Indian male musical theatre actors
20th-century Indian male singers
21st-century Indian male singers